Daniel Johansson may refer to:

Dan Johansson (born 1950), Swedish speed skater
Daniel Glimmenvall (born 1974), Swedish ice hockey player, formerly known as Daniel Johansson
Daniel Johansson (tenor) (born 1980), Swedish tenor
Daniel Johansson (ice hockey, born 1981), Swedish ice hockey player
Daniel Johansson (footballer) (born 1987), Swedish footballer

See also
Daniel Johannsen (born 1978), Austrian tenor
Daniel Johansen (disambiguation)